Bagginswood is a small village, In Shropshire, near to Stottesdon.
 A large amount of it is farming land and a lot of Agriculture work is done around there.
Bagginswood is set within an area of outstanding natural beauty and sits centre of a triangle of beautiful quaint riverside towns including Bridgnorth, Ludlow and Bewdley which is just 4 miles from the historic market town of Cleobury Mortimer.

External links

Villages in Shropshire